Alexis Denisof (born February 25, 1966) is an American actor, primarily known for playing Wesley Wyndam-Pryce in the television series Buffy the Vampire Slayer and its spin-off Angel. He also had a recurring role on How I Met Your Mother. His wife, Alyson Hannigan, starred in both Buffy the Vampire Slayer and How I Met Your Mother.

Early life
Denisof was born in Salisbury, Maryland, the son of Christiana Taylor and Gerald Denisof. He is of Russian, Russian-Jewish, French, and Irish ancestry. He moved to Seattle, Washington, when he was three years old. He attended Highline College, where his mother was head of the drama department. After graduating from St Paul's School in Concord, New Hampshire at the age of seventeen, he moved to London, England, where he lived and worked for several years. While there, he studied at the London Academy of Music and Dramatic Art.

Career
Beginning his career in the film industry, Denisof was the fight director for a stage production of Hamlet, and in 1991 was the fight director for the BBC's The Other Side, Romeo and Juliet, and The Soul's Dark Night. His first lead role was alongside Sir Christopher Lee in the feature film Murder Story (1989) where he played an investigative reporter. One of his first known works in television was on the arcade version of the video for "Got My Mind Set On You" by George Harrison. In 1995, he landed a small part in the 1995 film First Knight, appearing as one of Arthur's round table knights in multiple scenes with Sean Connery and Richard Gere. Following those roles, Denisof worked with Sean Bean in three episodes of Sharpe as Lord John Rossendale in 1997.

His best-known character, Wesley Wyndam-Pryce, was introduced in 1999 in the third season of Buffy the Vampire Slayer as Buffy's replacement Watcher. Originally, Wyndam-Pryce was supposed to be killed off in the season 3 finale but, due to Whedon's surprise at how well he fit into the series, Denisof was given the choice about his character's fate and chose for him to live. As a result, Wyndam-Pryce later arrived as a motorcycle riding rogue slayer in season one, episode 10 of Angel, and was an official main cast member from episode 11 on,  effectively replacing the late character Doyle. Wyndam-Pryce appeared in 100 out of the 110 episodes of the series.

The end of the series in 2004 saw a lag in Denisof's career. Save for appearing in three episodes of the hit series How I Met Your Mother, as the goofy philandering Sandy Rivers, Denisof would not work as much as he used to for the next several years. During this time he appeared in several stage productions, including Rope at Chichester Festival Theatre's Minerva Theatre with Anthony Head, who played Wesley's predecessor Rupert Giles on Buffy.  Denisof was among 200 actors considered for the role of James Bond in Casino Royale, but lost out to Daniel Craig. Later, in 2008, he appeared in season 2 of Private Practice as a man named Daniel, a bigamist who has two pregnant wives who don't know about each other. In 2009, he appeared in four episodes of Joss Whedon's Dollhouse as Senator Daniel Perrin.

In 2011, Denisof reprised his recurring role in How I Met Your Mother, as Sandy Rivers; he ultimately appeared in 10 episodes total, and his last appearance was in the episode "Gary Blauman". In a season 1 commentary, creators Craig Thomas and Carter Bays speculated that Denisof was initially reluctant to take the role back in 2006 because he feared it was just charity work on account of his wife, Hannigan, playing a main character on the show. They went on to state that he was not aware, until they actually told him, that they were huge fans of his work dating back to his time on Angel.

Since 2011, Denisof has been relatively active. He played a voice role in the animated DC film Justice League: Doom. He was featured in the majority of episodes in the AOL webseries, Little Women, Big Cars. He was then cast as a lead in Bryan Singer's new webseries H+: The Digital Series. He then reunited with Joss Whedon for two different film projects. The first was a minor role in the summer blockbuster The Avengers, as The Other, a servant of the character Thanos, and a cohort of Loki. The second was the lead male role in a modern version of Shakespeare's Much Ado About Nothing, which premiered at the Toronto Film Festival, to positive reviews from critics. The film was released worldwide in June 2013.

In August 2013 he was cast in the third season of NBC's Grimm as a recurring character named Viktor Albert Wilhelm George Beckendorf. In 2014, Denisof reprised his role as The Other in Guardians of the Galaxy. In the same year he began starring in the MTV television series Finding Carter as David Wilson. As of 2018, Denisof starred in the web series I Love Bekka & Lucy as Glenn, and was nominated for a Primetime Emmy Award for Outstanding Actor in a Short Form Comedy or Drama Series, his first such nomination.

On November 28, 2018, Deadline Hollywood reported that Denisof would play the recurring role of Adam Masters in the second season of Netflix's Chilling Adventures of Sabrina. In 2019 he began playing the recurring role of Professor Vardemus in the supernatural television show Legacies.

Personal life

According to the DVD release of Angels season five, three weeks before the filming of the season premiere, Denisof was stricken with Bell's palsy, from which he later recovered. Due to the paralysis of the left side of his face, scenes were structured to not show its effects.

Denisof married past co-star Alyson Hannigan, who played Willow Rosenberg in Buffy the Vampire Slayer, on October 11, 2003. The couple live in Encino, Los Angeles. They have two daughters: Satyana Marie, born in March 2009, and Keeva Jane, born in May 2012.

Filmography

Film

Television

References

External links

 
 

1966 births
20th-century American male actors
21st-century American male actors
Male actors from Maryland
Male actors from Washington (state)
American expatriates in England
American male film actors
American male stage actors
American male television actors
 American people of French descent
 American people of Irish descent
 American people of Russian-Jewish descent
Living people
People from Salisbury, Maryland
St. Paul's School (New Hampshire) alumni
Highline College alumni